Alan Hart may refer to:

 Alan Hart (television executive) (1935–2021), British television executive
 Alan Hart (writer) (1942–2018), British journalist
 Alan L. Hart (1890–1962), American physician
 Alan Hart (footballer) (born 1956), English former footballer